William Ryan Owens (March 5, 1980 – January 29, 2017) was a decorated United States Navy SEAL senior chief petty officer. He died in the Yakla raid in Yemen, making him the first American to die in combat under the Trump administration.

Early life
Owens was born on March 5, 1980, in Peoria, Illinois. He grew up in Fort Lauderdale, Florida and Chillicothe, Illinois. Owens' parents worked at the Fort Lauderdale Police Department, where his father was a policeman and a military veteran while his mother was a detective. One of Owens' brothers retired from the Navy SEALs and the other brother works for the Hollywood Police Department. Owens attended Illinois Valley Central High School and graduated in 1998.

Career
Owens joined the United States Navy on August 24, 1998. He served in the Office of Naval Intelligence in Suitland, Maryland from 1999 until 2001. Owens then reported to Naval Amphibious Base Coronado for Basic Underwater Demolition/SEAL Training (BUD/S). He graduated BUD/S Class 239 in 2002 and subsequently completed SEAL Qualification Training (SQT). Owens was then assigned to SEAL Team ONE in Coronado, California from January 2003 to January 2007. In 2007, he volunteered for Naval Special Warfare Development Group and completed a specialized selection and training course. He was on five tours of duty during the course of his career as a Navy SEAL. He became a chief petty officer in 2009, and was promoted to senior chief petty officer a week after his death. CNN reported that during these tours, he helped rescue comrades who were pinned down and wounded, and guided in MEDEVAC choppers while under fire.

CNN reported that Owens was awarded the Silver Star (posthumously) for actions during a three-day battle in Somalia in July 2015, in which Owens led a 12-man team alongside local forces against 400 al Qaeda militants. His citation states that he was ambushed with "small arms, machine guns, anti-aircraft guns, rocket propelled grenades, mortars, and improvised explosive devices" and that he "repeatedly exposed himself to enemy fire", helping eventually capture the town that had been under militant control for 10 years.

Owens was the recipient of two Bronze Star Medals, the Global War on Terrorism Service Medal, the Global War on Terrorism Expeditionary Medal, the Afghanistan Campaign Medal, the Iraq Campaign Medal, the National Defense Service Medal, the Good Conduct Medal, the Joint Meritorious Unit Award, the Achievement Medal, the Commendation Medal, the Sea Service Ribbon, and three Presidential Unit Citations.

Death
Owens died of wounds as a result of the Yakla raid, a U.S.-led Special Operations Forces attack in Al Bayda province in central Yemen, a terrorism-related mission during the Yemeni Civil War, on January 29, 2017. The need for the raid, which was planned by the Obama administration and took place six days after Trump was sworn into office, was questioned by Ryan's father, Bill Owens. Owens is buried at Arlington National Cemetery.

Tributes and controversy
On hearing of his death, Rear Admiral Timothy Szymanski, Commander of Naval Special Warfare Command, called Owens "an exceptional SEAL—an experienced warrior and a highly respected teammate who served silently, nobly and bravely through several combat deployments." He went on to express that "Ryan's legacy strengthens our own resolve and commitment to this crucial fight. We hope his family can find comfort in the love and support of Family, Friends and Teammates." President Donald Trump and his daughter Ivanka Trump paid their respects on the arrival of Owens' remains at Dover Air Force Base on February 1, 2017. President Trump said, "My deepest thoughts and humblest prayers are with the family of this fallen service member."

On February 27, 2017, in an interview with Fox News, President Trump said: "This was a mission that was started before I got here. This was something that was, you know, just they wanted to do. They came to see me. They explained what they wanted to do, the generals, who are very respected. My generals are the most respected that we've had in many decades I believe. And they lost Ryan." President Trump paid tribute to Owens during his address to a joint session of Congress on February 28, 2017, saying, "Ryan's legacy is etched into eternity."

Owens' father, William Owens, a military veteran, refused to meet with President Trump and asked for an investigation into his son's death. He stated: "I didn't want to make a scene about it, but my conscience wouldn't let me talk to him [Trump]." He also criticized Trump for refusing to order an investigation, saying: "Don't hide behind my son's death to prevent an investigation."

Owens had become friends with San Francisco Giants pitcher Javier Lopez and other Giants players during a spring training visit. Owens' family collectively threw out the first pitch before the Giants' 2017 home opener. Javier Lopez described Owens as "[his] counselor".

Personal life
Owens and his wife, Carryn, had three children together.

References

1980 births
2017 deaths
People from Peoria, Illinois
People from Fort Lauderdale, Florida
United States Navy SEALs personnel
American military personnel killed in the War on Terror
Burials at Arlington National Cemetery
Violent deaths in Yemen
21st-century American military personnel
People from Chillicothe, Illinois